This is a list of museums in Liguria, Italy.

References

Liguria